National Voices is a coalition of health and social care charities in England formed in 2008.  It has more than 150 organisations in membership  which represent a diverse range of health conditions. It has a prominent role in representing patients and service users with national policy makers.

National Voices stated aim is to achieve “health and care systems which are person centred. This means that care is coordinated, people are in control of decisions about their health and care and everyone has fair access to care and support.”  It is particularly concerned with the interests of patients with long term conditions.

In 2013, National Voices and Think Local Act Personal published  a UK Department of Health commissioned ‘narrative for Person-Centred Coordinated Care’. The document defined good coordinated care from a patient and service user perspective and led to the production of a number of other ‘narratives’.

National Voices provides secretariat support to the People and Communities Board, one of the Five Year Forward View programme boards.

Charlotte Augst is the Chief Executive.  It is funded by membership fees, grant funding – including a grant from the Department of Health as one of its strategic partners – consultancy work and corporate sponsorship.

In October 2022 it took over the Health Service Journal for a week - a prize in the e-auction the journal ran in March to help people fleeing from Ukraine. Augst challenged system leaders, the readers of the journal, to "think differently about what is needed to repair the NHS".

See also 
 Social care in the United Kingdom

References

External links
 National Voices website

Social care in England